Rushville Consolidated High School, also known as "RCHS", is a high school in Rushville, Indiana, United States.

Drug testing
In 1998, the United States Court of Appeals for the Seventh Circuit supported a school policy that required students in all extracurricular activities to participate in random drug tests. These activities include sports teams, dances, academic teams, clubs, and any other school supported activities.  That was the first time a federal appeals court upheld such a policy for students other than athletes. The ruling was challenged by the ACLU, but the United States Supreme Court refused to hear the appeal.

Athletics
The school mascot is the lion, and the school colors are black and red.  The men's athletic teams are referred to as Lions, and the women's teams are referred to as Lady Lions.

See also
 List of high schools in Indiana

References

External links
 

Buildings and structures in Rush County, Indiana
Education in Rush County, Indiana
High schools in Indiana